The Karkheh Dam is a large multi-purpose earthen embankment dam built in Iran on the Karkheh River in 2001 by the Islamic Revolutionary Guards Corps (IRGC).

The dam is in the northwestern province of Khūzestān, the closest city being Andimeshk to the east. The Karkheh Dam is designed to irrigate  of land, produce 520 MW of hydro-electricity and prevent downstream floods.

Mean annual electricity generation is approximately 700 GWh. Based on IWPCO records, dam's power plant generated total of 4,941 GWh electricity during 2002–2008. In 2014 the maximum water in the reservoir of the dam reached  and it is estimated that this number will be even less in 2015.

Construction
In 1956, studies began on the Karkheh Dam by the American company Development and Resources Corporation, which was headed by David E. Lilienthal, the former Chairman of the Tennessee Valley Authority (TVA). In 1990, the final studies and design were completed by Mahab Ghodss Consulting Engineers, directed by master engineer Mohammad Soleymani. 
The engineering division of the Islamic Revolutionary Guards Corps (IRGC) started construction on the Karkheh Dam in 1992 and the dam was complete in 2001. During construction, 120 contractual and over eight consultative companies worked on the dam; 5,000 workers constructed the dam and 40 were killed in the process.

References

External links

Dams in Khuzestan Province
Hydroelectric power stations in Iran
Reservoirs in Iran
Buildings and structures in Khuzestan Province
Earth-filled dams
Dams completed in 2001
Dams in the Tigris–Euphrates river system